The Med City Marathon is an annual marathon in Rochester, Minnesota, started 1996. The race course is certified by the USATF and is one of the races in the US that can qualify a runner for the Boston Marathon.
Although the race was formerly a point-to-point course from the Rochester International Airport, to the Mayo Civic Center in downtown Rochester, the 25th running in 2021 saw a course change to a two-loop route around the city. Previously, Mayo Clinic and Scheels were main sponsors of the marathon. In 2021, Rochester's Active PT and Sports became the main sponsor.

Course
Prior to 2021, the marathon was a point-to-point race with one large loop. The race started near the Rochester International Airport, right off US Route 63. The course went north for eight miles through rural agricultural area before turning east at the Zumbro River, following paved trails to Soldiers Field Golf Course and Mayo Park into Rochester.

The course continued in the city, going east on roads for more than a mile, turned at Quarry Hill Nature Center, and followed the north banks of Silver Creek and Silver Lake before following Cascade Creek west past Cascade Lake. The race route went south and connected the loop, and the runners followed the Zumbro once again, this time ending at the Mayo Civic Center.

Race weekend
The race weekend begins with the Med City Fitness Expo in the Mayo Civic Center. Outside the expo, the Altra Federal Credit Union 5K kicks off the race weekend. The Ronald McDonald family 1.8 mile walk and various kids races add to the festivities. The following day, a 20-mile race, a half marathon and a marathon relay start in the morning at the same time and place as the marathon.

History
Heat has been a factor in this southern Minnesota marathon. In 2006, the hot air forced race organizers to close the race after three hours. The start time was moved up an hour the next year. In 2018, the marathon, marathon relay, and the 20-mile race were canceled due to hot weather again. Runners in that year were given entry in the half-marathon.

The race was founded and directed for many years by local runners Wally and Peggy Arnold, though the local YMCA took management for a few years.

In 2009, race officials faced new competition from two more marathons, St. Croix Events' Stillwater Marathon and Team Ortho's Minneapolis Marathon. Both new events were scheduled for the same week as Med City, which was already facing competition from the other large regional marathons: Fargo and Madison. Race directors for the Stillwater and Minneapolis marathons claimed their race weekends would draw more than 4,000 runners (each), so many people questioned whether Med City would survive. Consistency prevailed though, and by 2016, both the Stillwater and Minneapolis marathons folded.

The course has changed several times through the years. In 1996, the course did a few loops in the city. The course had a slight change in 1998, but then in 2007, the marathon course started runners in Byron, Minnesota. Changes were made again to shift the start from west side of Byron, where the school is, to the east side of the town. 

Race directors in 2013 changed the running route more to avoid crossing trains tracks late in the race. In previous years, Canadian Pacific managers would not halt trains during the marathon, despite the requests from race directors. Most races saw no problem, but in 2001, a train moving through on race day caused a five-minute delay for many runners. It happened again in 2013 as a cold rain fell on runners at the 25-mile mark. The next year, the course was shifted. Now runners cross tracks only at the beginning of the race.

2019 saw a totally new course, when the start of the race was moved just north of Stewartville, Minnesota, near the Rochester International Airport. 

In 2014, 413 runners finished the full marathon. Walz is now Minnesota's governor. He finished in 4:46:22.

An official race sponsor was added in 2015: the North Dakota-based Scheels, which had opened a large store in the Apache Mall that year.

In March 2020, the COVID-19 pandemic in Minnesota (caused by the virus SARS-CoV-2) had spread to Minnesota and Gov. Tim Walz ordered nearly all places of gathering and commerce closed with an executive order to stay at home. Run for the Lakes Marathon and Grandma's Marathon canceled all races, and the Boston Marathon decided to postpone their 2020 race. 

By April 6, nearly 1,000 people in the state had contracted COVID-19, and the race organizers decided to postpone the race weekend to September 5–6. By June 23, the Boston Marathon and Twin Cities Marathon (in October) had canceled all events, but Med City was still on for early September. But on July 20, race director Mark Bongers put out a press release announcing the cancelation of the marathon, writing that "after conversations with the Minnesota Department of Health, members of the Minnesota Running Industry Task Force, the USATF, Mayo Clinic Emergency Medicine physicians, our sponsors and community leaders on how we could safely race, we came to the conclusion that it just isn't possible with so many ongoing uncertainties surrounding the COVID-19
pandemic."

In 2021, the race was postponed again, in the hopes that it would run September 12 with the blessing of the department of health and the city of Rochester. Although COVID-19 cases were rising again, the race was held, though the number of participants was much lower. When the race took place, spectators saw the closest ever finish. Levi Severson came from behind Mike Walentiny at mile 26 and took first by just 15 seconds.

As of 2021, six people had run the marathon every year: Allen Holtz, Jeff Miller, Nels Pierson, Pete Martin, Tom Perri, and Ward Lenius.

Results

Key:

All cities in Minnesota unless indicated otherwise

* Due to hot weather, race official called runners off the course. The race was officially canceled after 3 hours, though results were listed through 4 hours and 30 minutes.

** A "virtual" race was scheduled.

References

External links
 
 
 

Foot races in Minnesota
Marathons in Minnesota
Marathons in the United States
Recurring sporting events established in 1996